"Won't Make a Fool Out of You" is a single by the American R&B and Soul singer Marcus Canty. It appears on the soundtrack to the 2012 film Think Like a Man.

Charts

Release history

References

 
 
 
 
 

2012 songs
Songs written by Tricky Stewart
Songs written by Johntá Austin
Epic Records singles